Nontetha Nkwenkwe (c. 1875 - May 20, 1935) was a Xhosa prophetess who lived in colonial South Africa and began a religious movement that caused her to be committed to asylums by the South African government from 1923 until her death in 1935. She is regarded as one of the most remarkable female religious leaders associated with independent churches in the 1920s.

Life prior to 1918 

Nontetha Nkwenkwe was born in 1875 in King William's Town in what is now the Eastern Cape province of South Africa. She was of Xhosa descent, and settled in Khulile village, near Debe Nek, now part of Raymond Mhlaba Local Municipality. She served her community as an herbalist (ixhwele). She had ten children, five of whom lived to adulthood. Her husband, Bungu Nkwenkwe, died while searching for work.
She never joined a Christian church, but baptized her children and was influenced by the Ethiopian church of Dwane as well as the American Methodist Episcopal Church.

Prophet 

Following the outbreak of the influenza epidemic in 1918 which devastated her area, Nkwenkwe believed that she was spared for a divine purpose. And in undertaking her work as first a seer, then a diviner, and ultimately a prophet, her life was changed dramatically. She began having visions and telling locals that God had told her the epidemic was punishment for people's sins and that her mission was to reform society.

She also "read" messages from God by looking at her hands.  At first Nkwenkwe's activities were welcomed by the authorities, unlike some of her contemporary male counterparts like Enoch Mgijima. Authorities welcomed her as they understood her sermons to be encouraging her congregation to abstain from alcohol consumption, immorality, dances, and other traditional customs. Nontetha’s movement grew rapidly in rural Ciskei, East London, Middledrift and King William's Town.

However, in the wake of the Bulhoek massacre where a 183 African Israelites were killed at Bulhoek in 1921, white attitudes to any large-scale black gatherings became increasingly paranoid.  Officials reported that farm workers around Fort Beaufort (near Fort Hare) had been ‘enraptured by her message and were reluctant to return to work’.  The government became suspicious of any independent black thinkers. Nkwenkwe's great-grandson Mzimkhulu Bungu believes that some established mission churches, worried about her growing following, had also complained about her activities.

Nkwenkwe's sermons also encouraged unity among educated and "red" Xhosa people, something that was in conflict with the colonial system's divide and conquer mechanism. According to  Edgar, R and Sapire, H, she was further accused of ‘encouraging Africans to boycott white churches'. She was now seen as subversive, [was] arrested, and jailed in 1922.

Incarceration 

Nkwenkwe continued to preach despite the terms of her release, and she was re-arrested in April 1923. The arrest of Nkwenkwe enraged her supporters. In a show of solidarity, hundreds of her supporters gathered, ready to engage the authorities in the event that she was charged. Mindful of the disorder that could be unleashed by a possible court appearance, the authorities committed Nontetha to Fort Beaufort Mental Hospital. Her followers would walk as far as 80 km to the town to consult with her. In 1924, Nkwenkwe was transferred to the Weskoppies Mental Hospital in Pretoria, the government's prime psychiatric observation institution. After two years of no correspondence about her condition, Nkwenkwe's supporters decided to visit their leader in Pretoria.

On November 23, 1926, her followers began a 1000 km walk which lasted for 55 days, walking from Eastern Cape to Pretoria. When they met her on January 18, 1927, the movement had grown as some people joined them along the way. A second pilgrimage was cut short and the marchers loaded back onto trains after crossing the Orange River at Aliwal North without passes in 1930.

Nkwenkwe died on May 20, 1935 of liver and stomach cancer. Her family was notified by telegram, but by the time they were able to respond, she had been buried in an unmarked grave. Her followers expressed their hope that one day Nontetha's remains would be returned. In 1997, Robert Edgar and Hilary Sapire began to assist in locating Nontetha's grave, and her remains were reburied at her home in Khulile village in 1998.

Legacy
Nkwenkwe did not only establish the Church of the Prophetess Nontetha, which has 30,000 members today, but also enhanced the role women held within the church in the 1920s.

See also 
 Bulhoek Massacre
 Nongqawuse, prophet who precipitated the Xhosa cattle-killing movement and famine
 Nontsizi Mgqwetho
 Khotso Sethuntsa

External links
 Nontetha Nkwenkwe

References

1875 births
1935 deaths
South African religious leaders
Female religious leaders
Prophets
Xhosa people
19th-century apocalypticists
20th-century apocalypticists
Founders of new religious movements